The Servant (lit. "The Story of Bang-ja" or "Bang-ja Chronicles", compare to Chunhyangjeon) is a 2010 South Korean historical romantic drama film starring Kim Joo-hyuk, Jo Yeo-jeong and Ryoo Seung-bum. It re-tells the origins of the famous Korean folktale Chunhyangjeon from the perspective of the male protagonist Lee Mong-ryong's servant.

The film was a box office hit, receiving 3,014,523 admissions.

Plot 
Throughout the movie, the scene switches between the 'present' Bang providing the narration, and the flashback events of his past.
 
While a servant, Bangja shares his rooms with Mr. Ma, a notorious womanizer and self-stylized Lothario. Bangja escorts his master (Mong-ryong) to an evening out at the local pleasure house, where they are witness to a performance by the madam's daughter Chunhyang. While trying to arrange a meeting between Chunhyang and his rather clumsy and socially awkward master, Bangja defends Mong-ryong from a larger, disgruntled patron and inadvertently impresses both Chunhyang and her maidservant Hyangdan.
 
Mr. Ma begins to coach the simple, honest Bangja in the ways of seducing women, which Bang uses to secure a picnic outing for Mong-ryong with Chunhyang through Hyangdan. During the excursion, Bangja so astounds the ladies by cooking meat to perfection, recovering Chunhyang's slipper from the waterfall pool, and carrying her on his back after she injured her ankle, that a love triangle rapidly begins to form between the two women and Bangja, much to the consternation of Mong-ryong, though he boasts that he is slowly luring Chunhyang to him by playing hard to get.
 
While his master continues to study, Bangja attempts to court Chunhyang. Mr. Ma continues to provide instruction to Bangja, assuaging his concerns when he thinks his master may have slept with her, and pushing him to seize upon spending the night with her before his master can. Though Bangja's seduction is clumsy and his approach very tentative, Chunhyang begins to fall for him and makes love to him on several occasions. Due to his low social-standing, however, she seeks to marry Mong-ryong and enlists Bangja's help in order to make this plan a reality.
 
When Mong-ryong is called away to Seoul to finish studying and take his exam he asks Bangja to recover a written promise he gave Chunhyang about marrying her. She catches Bangja as he tries to steal the paper, and switches it for a confession letter she wrote and got him to sign the night the two of them first had sex. Mong-ryong reads the letter and dismisses Bangja from his service for having deceived him.
 
Three years pass, and Bangja and Chunhyang grow closer and continue to love each other while Bangja becomes the servant of Chunhyang's house and runs errands for a local strong man. However, Chunhyang begins to take after her mother and grows increasingly manipulative despite her burgeoning love for Bangja.
 
In Seoul, Mong-ryong takes his exams and becomes a Royal Inspector. After insulting the court eunuchs however, he is accorded a lowly position in his home town, subservient to the new governor.
 
Mong-ryong finds Hyangdan has become the madam of her own house and runs a successful business. She sleeps with Mong-ryong and asks him if she is not more desirable and pleasing than Chunhyang, but expresses remorse that Bangja chose Chunhyang over her.
 
Mong-ryong discusses women with his magistrate and later returns to Chunhyang's house. Mong-ryong goes for a walk with Chunhyang, and though it is not revealed what the two discussed, Chunhyang returns with a pleased expression and an expectation of seeing Mong-ryong again.
 
The magistrate visits Chunhyang's house and after a confrontation with his own clerks and then Bangja, is greeted by a beautiful, but uncooperative Chunhyang who refuses to sit and pour his drinks because she is not a gisaeng. Enraged by her arrogance, the governor beats Bangja when he attempts to interfere, and has Chunhyang imprisoned. Bangja goes to Mong-ryong and implores his old master to help save her life.
 
Later, during a celebration, the magistrate is seen in a back room attempting to sexually excite Chunhyang because Mong-ryong had told him that she would only bow to his wishes and fulfill his desires if he were violent with her. Bangja causes a commotion to get the magistrate to release her, but is saved from being beaten by the guards when Mong-ryong arrives with a large contingent of guards. Mong-ryong arrests the magistrate and has Chunhyang whipped for her insolence until Bangja interferes, claiming that she has a husband whom she was remaining faithful to. Chunhyang stabs herself with a small blade, saying to Mong-ryong (whose face was hidden) that she wanted news of her death taken to Master Lee Mong-ryong.
 
Bangja is visited in his cell, first by Mr. Ma, who warns him to never beg a woman to stay, then by Chunhyang, who reveals that she and Mong-ryong planned the whole event after he returned from his exams. For the first time, Bangja confesses his love to Chunhyang. She then tells Mong-ryong that she will not leave without Bangja, and so the three of them depart the city together. When the trio stop at the waterfall where they had their first excursion years before, Mong-ryong pushes Chunhyang down the falls and she is seen face-down in the water. Bangja dives in to save her and runs away, carrying her on his back as he did when she injured her ankle.
 
The 'present' Bangja tells the writer that he ran from Mong-ryong and his agents for a long time after those events. The last thing he does to bring the story to close is bring the writer to the back of his warehouse to see Chunhyang who survived the fall, but was left with brain damage and has 'become a child'.
 
The writer declares that Bangja is an amazing man and will make him the hero of a wonderful story about a servant's love, but Bangja insists that the story be told with her fabricated fidelity being the truth, and Chunhyang living happily ever after with a Lee Mong-ryong who loved her and returned for her. When asked why, he says it was because it was something she never got to have, and he is happy with being the hero in his heart.
 
Bangja requests one scene be written to demonstrate the love between the two characters, which he demonstrates by carrying Chunhyang around the room on his back and singing a variation of the song Sarangga from the pansori Chunhyangga while she smiles lovingly and snowflakes slowly fall on them from the open roof.
 
The last scenes are of people in the village where they lived, the times when she entertained guests at her house with her singing, and of her shoe in the ice below the waterfall where he saved her.

Cast
Kim Joo-hyuk ... Bang-ja
Jo Yeo-jeong ... Chun-hyang
Ryoo Seung-bum ... Lee Mong-ryong 
Oh Dal-su ... Mr. Ma 
Ryu Hyun-kyung ... Hyang-dan 
Song Sae-byeok ... Byeon Hak-do 
Jung Yang ... Wol-rae 
Kim Sung-ryung ... Wol-mae 
Gong Hyung-jin ... man with colored glasses
Kim Min-kyo ... Eunuch
Moon Won-joo as Mal-ho

Awards and nominations
2010 19th Buil Film Awards
Best New Actor - Song Sae-byeok

2010 47th Grand Bell Awards
Best Supporting Actor - Song Sae-byeok
Best Costume Design - Jung Kyung-hee
Nomination - Best Film
Nomination - Best Actress - Jo Yeo-jeong
Nomination - Best Supporting Actor - Oh Dal-su
Nomination - Best Supporting Actress - Ryu Hyun-kyung

2010 8th Korean Film Awards
Best Art Direction - Park Il-hyun
Nomination - Best Film
Nomination - Best Supporting Actor - Song Sae-byeok
Nomination - Best Supporting Actress - Ryu Hyun-kyung
Nomination - Best New Actor - Song Sae-byeok
Nomination - Best Screenplay - Kim Dae-woo

2010 11th Busan Film Critics Awards
Best Screenplay - Kim Dae-woo

2010 31st Blue Dragon Film Awards
Popular Star Award - Jo Yeo-jeong
Nomination - Best Supporting Actor - Oh Dal-su
Nomination - Best Supporting Actress - Ryu Hyun-kyung
Nomination - Best New Actress - Jo Yeo-jeong
Nomination - Best Art Direction - Park Il-hyun
Nomination - Best Original Screenplay - Kim Dae-woo

2011 47th Baeksang Arts Awards
Nomination - Best Actress - Jo Yeo-jeong
Nomination - Best New Actor - Song Sae-byeok
Nomination - Best Screenplay - Kim Dae-woo

References

External links 
  
 The Servant at Naver 
 
 
 

2010 films
2010 romantic drama films
South Korean romantic drama films
South Korean historical romance films
Films set in the Joseon dynasty
Films based on The Tale of Chunhyang
Films directed by Kim Dae-woo
Films with screenplays by Kim Dae-woo
2010s Korean-language films
CJ Entertainment films
2010s South Korean films